Jagatsinghpur is a town and a municipality in Jagatsinghpur district in the Indian state of Odisha. It is also the headquarters of Jagatsinghpur district. It got the recognition as a new district on 1 April 1993 formerly it was a sub-division of cuttack district. Paradip Port, Oil refinery and fertilizer factory are located in Jagatsinghpur district. Devi, Alaka, Biluakhai, Kusumi, Hansua, Kuanria and Lunijhara rivers belong to this district.

1999 odissa Super cyclone 
over 8,000 deaths occurred in Jagatsinghpur.

Geography
It has an average elevation of 15 metres (49 feet).

History

Jagatsinghpur District came into existence on 1 April 1993. Before that, it was a part of the old Cuttack District which was divided into four new districts. It is surrounded by the districts of Kendrapara, Cuttack, Khorda, Puri and Bay of Bengal.

Transportation
The nearest railway station from Jagatsinghpur town is Gorakhnath Station which is about 10 km from Jagatsinghpur.  Train service is not frequent; it is better to go by road. Nearest airport is Biju Patnaik International Airport at Bhubaneswar. Charter air service from Biju Patnaik International Airport to Paradip is provided by Pawan Hans. Jagatsinghpur is well connected with other cities via road. Ministry of Road Transport and Highways, Government of India has decided to link Jagatsinghpur with a new national highway. OSRTC operated bus services to all the major Cities and Towns in Odisha.

Notable people born in Jagatsinghpur
The district, smallest in size among the 30 districts in Odisha, has produced some of the most famous names in Oriya. Notable among them are listed below.
 Prof. Dr. Anjan Kumar Baral, Winner of Education Award of Excellence (Academic), 2018, from Printing Industries of America, the first Asian to receive the award in the field of Print Education & Research, for his outstanding work in advancing print education programs, in his home country, India.
Academicians and Scientists: Prana Krushna Parija, Sriram Chandra Dash, Manoranjan Mohanty, Abani Kumar Baral, Amitav Acharya, Dr. Biswaranjan Paital
Writers and poets: Birakisore Das, Gopal Chhotray, Pratibha Ray, Bibhuti Patnaik, Hrudananda Ray, Chittaranjan Das, Devdas Chhotray Mamata Dash
Freedom fighters, Politicians and Leaders: Nabakrushna Choudhuri, Malati Choudhury, Nityanand Kanungo, Sarala Devi, Yudhisthir Das

Theatre groups
The District is also famous for having theatre groups which keep the old tradition of live acting before a crowd. The groups have become the part of the mainstream entertainment for people all over Odisha. Parbati Gannatya, Benirampur opera, Gouri Gananatya, Tulasi Gananatya, Durgashree Gananatya, Tarapur Opera and Trinath Gananatya are some of the famous theatre groups of Jagatsinghpur district.

Politics
Current chairperson of Jagatsinghpur municipality is Archana Singh (Indian National Congress), successor of Biplab Choudhry in 2022 (Indian National Congress) and MLA from Jagatsinghpur Assembly Constituency is Prasanta Muduli of Biju Janata Dal. Previous MLAs from this Constituency were Chiranjib Biswal (Congress) between 2014-2019 Bishnu Das (BJD) between 2004–2013, Kailash Chandra Mallik of (Indian National Congress) in 1985, Krushna Chandra Mallik of (Indian National Congress) in 1980, and Kanduri Charan Mallik of JNP in 1977.

Jagatsinghpur is a part of the Jagatsinghpur (Lok Sabha constituency).

Villages
 

Kamashasan

References

External links
 http://jagatsinghpur.nic.in/
 http://www.jagatsinghpur.com/

Cities and towns in Jagatsinghpur district